Jerry Collins Stadium is a multi-purpose sporting complex in Porirua, New Zealand. It currently serves as the home ground of rugby union club Northern United RFC and the Wellington Rugby League representative team, as well as the second home for Team Wellington of the New Zealand Football Championship. Porirua Park also has a Softball field located at the western end of the park.

Porirua Park Stadium was officially renamed Jerry Collins Stadium on 25 March 2016, in memory of the late All Black.

Football
Jerry Collins Park serves as the secondary home for Team Wellington in the New Zealand Football Championship. As the primary home stadium Newtown Park also serves as the primary track and field complex in Wellington, clashes with athletics events often results in at least one match being played in Porirua every season. With expansion expected to occur for the 2010–11 season, a Porirua-based franchise has bid for inclusion, which would likely be based full-time at Porirua Park.

JC Park serves as the home for midweek preseason friendlies between professional club Wellington Phoenix FC and local amateur clubs.

JC park has hosted international football, with the New Zealand Under-23 team recording a historic 1–0 victory over the Chile Under-23 as part of preparations for the 2008 Beijing Olympics.

Rugby league
During the 1988 Great Britain Lions tour the Wellington rugby league team defeated the Lions 24–18 at Porirua Park before a crowd of 4,428.

Rugby union
Porirua Park is the home field for Wellington Rugby Football Union club Northern United RFC.

The ground also often hosts pre-season fixtures for the professional Wellington Lions and the Super Rugby's Hurricanes.

References

Association football venues in New Zealand
Sports venues in Porirua
Multi-purpose stadiums in New Zealand